"Only the Young" is the second solo single by American singer-songwriter and The Killers frontman, Brandon Flowers, from his debut studio album Flamingo. The song was written by Flowers and produced by Stuart Price.

Critical reception
Entertainment Weekly encouraged readers to download the tune, calling it a "bittersweet lament".

Music video
The video was filmed in Flowers' hometown of Las Vegas, Nevada in the Aqua Theater at the Wynn Las Vegas, featuring performers from Le Rêve. It was directed by Sophie Muller, who previously directed a video for The Killers' song, "Mr. Brightside". It has more than 6 million views as of December 2013.

Track listing
Promo CD single
"Only the Young" (radio edit) – 4:02
"Only the Young" (album version) – 4:19
"Only the Young" (DJ Lynnwood Radio Edit) – 3:31
"Only the Young" (DJ Lynnwood Extended Remix) – 7:20
"Only the Young" (DJ Lynnwood Remix – No Bridge) – 6:43
"Only the Young" (DJ Lynnwood Dubstrumental) – 6:38

Other remixes
"Only the Young" (Roger Sanchez Release Yourself Remix)
"Only the Young" (Jesse Marco & Cool Cat Remix)

Charts

References

2010 singles
Brandon Flowers songs
Pop ballads
Songs written by Brandon Flowers
Song recordings produced by Stuart Price
Music videos directed by Sophie Muller
2010 songs
Island Records singles